Weimarer Land I – Saalfeld-Rudolstadt III is an electoral constituency (German: Wahlkreis) represented in the Landtag of Thuringia. It elects one member via first-past-the-post voting. Under the current constituency numbering system, it is designated as constituency 30. It covers the western and southern of Weimarer Land and the northern part of Saalfeld-Rudolstadt.

Weimarer Land I – Saalfeld-Rudolstadt III was created for the 1994 state election. Originally named Weimar-Land I – Schwarzakreis III, it was renamed after the 1994 election. Since 2004, it has been represented by Mike Mohring of the Christian Democratic Union (CDU).

Geography
As of the 2019 state election, Weimarer Land I – Saalfeld-Rudolstadt III covers the western and southern of Weimarer Land and the northern part of Saalfeld-Rudolstadt, specifically the municipalities of Am Ettersberg, Bad Berka, Ballstedt, Bechstedtstraß, Blankenhain, Buchfart, Daasdorf a. Berge, Döbritschen, Ettersburg, Frankendorf, Großschwabhausen, Hammerstedt, Hetschburg, Hohenfelden, Hopfgarten, Ilmtal-Weinstraße (only Leutenthal and Rohrbach), Isseroda, Kapellendorf, Kiliansroda, Kleinschwabhausen, Klettbach, Kranichfeld, Lehnstedt, Magdala, Mechelroda, Mellingen, Mönchenholzhausen, Nauendorf, Neumark, Niederzimmern, Nohra, Oettern, Ottstedt a. Berge, Rittersdorf, Tonndorf, Troistedt, Umpferstedt, Vollersroda, and Wiegendorf (from Weimarer Land), and Rudolstadt (only Ammelstädt, Breitenherda, Eschdorf, Geitersdorf, Haufeld, Heilsberg, Milbitz, Remda, Sundremda, Teichel, Teichröda and Treppendorf), and Uhlstädt-Kirchhasel (from Saalfeld-Rudolstadt).

Members
The constituency has been held by the Christian Democratic Union since its creation in 1994. Its first representative was Bärbel Vopel, who served from 1994 to 2004. Since 2004, it has been represented by Mike Mohring.

Election results

2019 election

2014 election

2009 election

2004 election

1999 election

1994 election

References

Electoral districts in Thuringia
1994 establishments in Germany
Weimarer Land
Saalfeld-Rudolstadt
Constituencies established in 1994